Euphaedra vandeweghei is a butterfly in the family Nymphalidae. It is found in Gabon.

References

Butterflies described in 2004
vandeweghei
Endemic fauna of Gabon
Butterflies of Africa